Grange Corner is a small village in County Antrim, Northern Ireland. It is situated in the Borough of Ballymena. It had a population of 468 people (282 households) in the 2011 Census. (2001 Census: 282 people)

References

See also 
List of towns and villages in Northern Ireland

Villages in County Antrim